Brewster Island is a small island lying northeast of Danco Island in Errera Channel, off the west coast of Graham Land. It was shown on an Argentine government chart of 1950, and named by the UK Antarctic Place-Names Committee in 1960 for Sir David Brewster, Scottish natural philosopher who in 1844 improved the mirror stereoscope invented by Sir Charles Wheatstone by substituting prisms.

See also 
 List of Antarctic and sub-Antarctic islands

References
 

Islands of Graham Land
Danco Coast